Events from the year 1916 in art.

Events
 February 5 – Cabaret Voltaire is opened by German poet Hugo Ball and his future wife Emmy Hennings in the back room of Ephraim Jan's Holländische Meierei in Zürich; although surviving only until the summer it is pivotal in the creation of Dada. Those who gather here include Marcel Janco, Richard Huelsenbeck, Tristan Tzara, Sophie Taeuber-Arp and Jean Arp.
 February 9 : 6.00 p.m. – Tristan Tzara "founds" Dada (according to Hans Arp).
 March 1 – Liljevalchs konsthall inaugurated in Stockholm.
 May 20 – Boy with Baby Carriage is Norman Rockwell's first cover for The Saturday Evening Post.
 May – Muirhead Bone recruited as a war artist by the British War Propaganda Bureau. At the end of the year, his album of drawings The Western Front begins publication.
 June 16 – Cleveland Museum of Art opens in the United States.
 July 14 – Hugo Ball recites the Dada manifesto in Zürich.
 Summer – Paul Strand experiments with 'straight' abstract photography at Twin Lakes (Connecticut).
 August 31 – Kestnergesellschaft founded in Hanover, Germany.
 September 19 – Edvard Munch's paintings for the Aula (festival hall) of Det Kongelige Frederiks Universitet, Christiania, are inaugurated.
 September 26 – C. R. W. Nevinson's first major single-artist exhibition opens in London.
 November – John Nash arrives with the Artists Rifles in France.
 Vanessa Bell's first single-artist exhibition is staged at Omega Workshops in London.
 Provincial Fine Arts Museum completed in Córdoba, Argentina.
 Gilbert Cannan publishes his novel Mendel: a story of youth, based on the lives of those in his artistic circle of friends with a young Mark Gertler as the central figure, together with Dora Carrington, Christopher R. W. Nevinson and John Currie. 
 Ezra Pound publishes Gaudier-Brzeska: A Memoir.

Works

 Paul Wayland Bartlett – Apotheosis of Democracy (pediment sculpture on United States Capitol)
 Vanessa Bell – Nude with Poppies
 Umberto Boccioni – Portrait of Ferruccio Busoni
 Constantin Brâncuși – Princess X (sculpture)
 Frank Brangwyn – Mosaic for apse of St Aidan's Church, Leeds, England
 George Clausen – Youth Mourning
 Giorgio de Chirico
 The Disquieting Muses
 The Melancholy of Departure
 Metaphysical Interior with Biscuits
 Marcel Duchamp – Apolinère Enameled (approximate date)
 Jacob Epstein – The Tin Hat (bronze head)
 Abel Faivre – On les aura! (recruiting poster)
 Paul Gustav Fischer – Sunbathing in the Dunes
 Mark Gertler
 Gilbert Cannan at his Mill
 Merry-Go-Round
 J. W. Godward
 Ancient Pastimes
 By The Blue Ionian Sea
 Lesbia With Her Sparrow
 George Grosz – Suicide
 Richard Jack – The Return to the Front: Victoria Railway Station
 Ernst Ludwig Kirchner – Königstein Station
 Laura Knight – Spring (original version)
 Boris Kustodiev
 Fontanka
 Shrovetide (Масленица)

 Alfred Laliberté – Les petits Baigneurs (bronze, Montreal)
 Fernand Léger – Soldier with a Pipe
 Wilhelm Lehmbruck – The Fallen (sculpture)
 Kazimir Malevich – Suprematist Composition
 Edward Middleton Manigault
 Still Life with Lemons
 Vorticist Landscape (War Impressions) (approximate date)
 Henri Matisse – The Piano Lesson
 Jean Metzinger
 Femme au miroir (Femme à sa toilette, Lady at her Dressing Table)
 Fruit and a Jug on a Table
 Amedeo Modigliani
 portrait of Beatrice Hastings
 Léon Indenbaum
 portrait of Max Jacob
 Jacques and Berthe Lipchitz
 two portraits of Chaïm Soutine
 Reclining Nude
 Claude Monet  – paintings in Water Lilies series
 Nympheas (Musée Marmottan Monet)
 Water Lilies (Museum of Fine Arts, Boston)
 C. R. W. Nevinson
 Archies
 The Doctor
 Dog-Tired
 French Troops Resting
 Maxfield Parrish and Louis Comfort Tiffany - Dream Garden (glass mosaic) commissioned for and installed in the lobby of the Curtis Center in Philadelphia, Pennsylvania
 Glyn Philpot
 Man in a Flying Jacket
 The Skyscraper
 Morton Livingston Schamberg – Untitled (Mechanical Abstraction)
 Matthew Smith – Fitzroy Street Nude No. 1
 Paul Strand (photographs)
 Abstraction, Porch Shadows, Twin Lakes, Connecticut
 White Fence

Births
 January 23 – David Douglas Duncan, American war photographer (died 2018)
 April 11 – Irv Novick, American comic book artist (died 2004)
 April 20 – Gerald Dillon, Irish painter (died 1971)
 April 26 – Eyvind Earle, American illustrator and Disney artist (died 2000)
 June 24 – Saloua Raouda Choucair, Lebanese painter and sculptor (died 2017)
 July 25 – Fred Lasswell, American cartoonist (died 2001)
 September 29 – Carl Giles, English cartoonist (died 1995)
 October 18 – Jean-Yves Couliou, French painter (died 1995)
 November 3 – Harry Lampert, American cartoonist, advertising artist and author (died 2004)
 November 10 – Louis le Brocquy, Irish painter (died 2012)
 November 25 – Villu Toots, Estonian calligrapher, book designer, educator, paleograph and author (died 1993)
 December 7 – John G. Morris, American picture editor (died 2017)

Deaths
 January 17 – Marie Bracquemond, French Impressionist painter (born 1840)
 February 13 – Vilhelm Hammershøi, Danish painter (born 1864)
 March 4 – Franz Marc, German Expressionist painter (born 1880) (killed in action during Battle of Verdun)
 June 25 – Thomas Eakins, American painter, sculptor and teacher (born 1844)
 June 29 – Georges Lacombe, French artist (born 1868)
 July 6 – Odilon Redon, French Symbolist painter and graphic artist (born 1840)
 July 29 – Eleanor Vere Boyle, English watercolorist (born 1825)
 August 17 – Umberto Boccioni, Italian Futurist painter and sculptor (born 1882) (died following a fall during cavalry training)
 August 23 – Jean-Paul Aubé, French sculptor (born 1837)
 August 28 – Henri Harpignies, French landscape painter of the Barbizon school (born 1819)
 October 25 – William Merritt Chase, American Impressionist painter (born 1849)
 December 13 – Antonin Mercié, French sculptor and painter (born 1845)
 date unknown
 Wu Shixian, Chinese landscape painter during the Qing dynasty (born unknown)
 Branko Radulović, Serbian painter (born 1885).

References

 
Years of the 20th century in art
1910s in art